Alexandra Carpentier (born 1987) is a French mathematical statistician and machine learning researcher known for her work in stochastic optimization, compressed sensing, and multi-armed bandit problems. She works in Germany as a professor at Otto von Guericke University Magdeburg and head of the Mathematical Statistics & Machine Learning research group.

Education and career
After studying probability theory, statistics, and economics at Paris Diderot University and ENSAE Paris, Carpentier earned a doctorate in 2012 through research at the French Institute for Research in Computer Science and Automation (Inria) in Lille.

She was a postdoctoral researcher at the University of Cambridge from 2012 through 2015, and then in 2015 became a professor at the University of Potsdam, funded through the Emmy Noether program of the German Research Foundation. In 2017 she moved to her present position at Otto von Guericke University Magdeburg.

Recognition
Carpentier received the 2020 von Kaven Award of the German Research Foundation.

References

External links
Home page

1987 births
Living people
French statisticians
Women statisticians
French computer scientists
French women computer scientists
Academic staff of the University of Potsdam
Academic staff of Otto von Guericke University Magdeburg